Pang Fengyue (born 19 January 1989) is a female Chinese footballer who plays as a midfielder for Changchun Jiuyin Loans in the CWSL.

International goals

External links 
 

1989 births
Living people
Chinese women's footballers
China women's international footballers
2015 FIFA Women's World Cup players
Footballers at the 2016 Summer Olympics
Footballers from Dalian
Women's association football midfielders
Footballers at the 2010 Asian Games
Olympic footballers of China
Dalian Quanjian F.C. players
Chinese Women's Super League players
Universiade gold medalists for China
Universiade medalists in football
Asian Games competitors for China
Changchun Zhuoyue players
Medalists at the 2011 Summer Universiade